Mystical Shit is the third studio album by experimental music band King Missile, released in 1990 by Shimmy Disc. It is the first of their albums to be recorded after guitarist Dave Rick and bassist Chris Xefos had joined and composer Stephen Tunney had departed the group to form Dogbowl. The album was first issued on vinyl record in 1990 and was later included on the compilation album Mystical Shit & Fluting on the Hump.

Reception

Stewart Mason of AllMusic described Mystical Shit as "a transitional album" and said "Dogbowl had decamped for a solo career and King Missile was firmly in Hall's hands; as a result, the album is much less musically interesting, the songs consisting of little more than noodly jams underneath Hall's surreal, often funny monologues. The critic went on to describe the album as "weaker than both its predecessors and King Missile's later career high point, Happy Hour, where Hall would finally regain the proper balance between music and lyrics." commended Hall for "spearheading New York's electric poetry movement" and said "the revamped King Missile sounds more focused than before, with the humor coming off as conceptual rather than jokey. Robert Christgau chose the track "Jesus Was Way Cool", written by Hall and bassist Chris Xefos, as the album's "choice cut".

Track listing

Personnel
Adapted from the Mystical Shit liner notes.

King Missile
 Steve Dansiger – drums, percussion
 John S. Hall – lead vocals, flute (A4), harmonica (B3)
 Dave Rick – guitar, backing vocals
 Chris Xefos – bass guitar, piano, organ, synthesizer, accordion, tuba, backing vocals

Production and design
 Mark Kramer – production, engineering, mixing

Release history

References

External links 
 
 
 Mystical Shit at iTunes

King Missile albums
1990 albums
Shimmy Disc albums
Albums produced by Kramer (musician)